Nemotelus bipunctatus is a species of soldier fly in the family Stratiomyidae.

Distribution
Bulgaria, Romania, Turkey, Ukraine.

References

Stratiomyidae
Insects described in 1846
Diptera of Europe
Taxa named by Hermann Loew